Super Thermal Power Stations or Super Power Station are a series of ambitious power projects planned by the Government of India. With India being a country of chronic power deficits, the Government of India has planned to provide 'power for all' by the end of the eleventh plan. The capacity of thermal power is 1000 MW and above. This would entail the creation of an additional capacity of at least 100,000 Megawatts by 2012. The Ultra Mega Power Projects, each with a capacity of 4000 megawatts or above, are being developed with the aim of bridging this gap.

The Super Thermal Power Stations were started by Government of India in the 1990s, but met with limited success. The Ministry of Power, in association with the Central Electricity Authority and Power Finance Corporation Ltd., has launched an initiative for the development of coal-based Super Thermal Power Stations in India. These projects will be awarded to developers on the basis of competitive bidding.

Ramagundam Super Thermal power station, one of the biggest thermal power stations in India, is a coal based power station situated at ramagundam in Karimnagar District.

The station started power generation in 1983. The station generates about 2600 MW of power annually. The fuel for the power generation is taken from the South Godavari Coal Fields and water is taken from Pochampad Dam. The power generated from the power plant is shared by the south Indian states of Andhra Pradesh, Karnataka, Tamil Nadu, Kerala and Pondicherry.

Thermal Power Station
Following are some of the super thermal power station in India having capacity greater than 1000 MW:

See also
Energy policy of India

Coal-fired power stations in India
Proposed power stations in India